Wigs on the Green is a 1935 satirical novel by Nancy Mitford. A roman à clef, it is notable for lampooning British fascism, specifically political enthusiasms of Mitford's sisters Unity Mitford and Diana Mosley.

Background
Using her sisters' wild fervour for fascism (and, in Unity's case, Nazism) as fodder for her satire, Mitford centred her plot around the character of Captain Jack (based on Sir Oswald Mosley, her sister Diana's future husband), the leader of the Union Jackshirts (based on the British Union of Fascists), and Eugenia Malmains (based on Mitford's sister Unity.) Always fond of cruel teasing, she was taken aback when Diana Mitford took offence to the novel and tried to placate her sister by excising the three chapters that dealt directly with the Captain Jack character. The novel still created a deep rift between the sisters.

When asked to republish the book after World War II, Mitford declined. The book was never republished in her lifetime, but 2010 saw its first reprint in the United Kingdom and the United States in more than 35 years.

External links
The Official Nancy Mitford Website 

1935 British novels
Anti-fascist books
British satirical novels
Novels by Nancy Mitford

fr:À la poursuite de l'amour